California is the third studio album by American experimental rock band Mr. Bungle. It was released on July 13, 1999, through Warner Bros.

Musical style and writing 

The album's 1999 press kit by Warner Bros. Records states, 

The songwriting process for California was much less collaborative than the band's previous albums. Despite having a more accessible sound than prior releases, saxophonist Clinton McKinnon has stated, "It wasn’t some attempt at reconciling how much we’d previously tortured our audiences with white-noise [...] it wasn’t some conscious attempt to normalise our music or make it all the more palatable." On the album's writing and sound, Trevor Dunn stated in a 2017 interview that, "[we] never discussed our projected direction. We never sat down and said, 'ok the last record was like that so now let’s attempt this.' Instead we individually brought things to the collective table that somehow coalesced without premeditation." He goes on to state that "the recording of California was a bit of a nightmare. We attempted frugality by recording a lot in our rehearsal space which [our guitarist] Trey [Spruance] had partially turned into a recording studio.  But we also spread the work out over various outside studios with a number of engineers as well as additional musicians.  In the end we had two 24-track tape machines and two ADAT machines linked. That record would have been much easier to manage had Pro Tools come along a bit sooner."

Regarding the album's title, drummer Danny Heifetz said in 1999, "More than anything, that title really sums up sonically what's going on on the record. It's very pleasant at times, and then there are a lot of little disasters that come up and present themselves, then blow over and go away like a storm. I would tend to explain it more like that, rather than, "Oh, California is this very deceptive place; it's bright on the outside and a really dark place on the inside." I mean, let's let the Chili Peppers do that." Trey Spruance, who had recently covered the Beach Boys' "Good Vibrations" for the album Smiling Pets, said that the work of Brian Wilson (particularly Smile) was "definitely" an influence, "especially when it comes to the Faustian scale of it."

Promotion and touring
To support the album, Mr. Bungle embarked on a large scale tour covering North America, Europe and Australia. They also notably appeared on the 2000 edition of the SnoCore Tour, performing alongside alternative metal acts whom they had influenced, such as Incubus and System of a Down. According to Dunn, Mr. Bungle were "completely out of place" on the SnoCore Tour. He remarked "We were sort of the grandpas of the tour, so we started really messing with the audiences. We dressed up like the Village People and acted super gay which really pissed off the metal kids." Guitarist Trey Spruance reflected on the SnoCore tour in 2002, recalling "some of us were going, 'Well … I guess … this’ll be an … adventure?' And that was the whole spirit we went into it with. You know, there’s this thing of, 'Yeah, man, we’ll reach all these other people! We can expand the audience!' I didn’t fucking believe that for a second. That kind of logic—it doesn’t get you anywhere; it doesn’t work. It’s a recipe for failure and disaster." When asked about the hostile audiences the band were subject to during the SnoCore shows, Spruance said, "those can be just magic moments. That’s definitely when Mike is at his best." Dunn recalls at one Snocore show in Myrtle Beach, the crowd were so angry towards Mr. Bungle that he thought they "might actually kill us." At the Myrtle Beach show, Mike Patton simulated giving his microphone a blow-job in an attempt to trigger the crowd, which angered them so much that they started throwing coins and other objects at his band.

Red Hot Chili Peppers conflict
A controversy with Anthony Kiedis/Red Hot Chili Peppers developed during the album's release. It was scheduled to be released on June 8, 1999, but Warner Bros. Records pushed it back so as not to coincide with the Red Hot Chili Peppers similarly titled album, Californication, which was to be released on the same day. Following the album release date conflict, Red Hot Chili Peppers vocalist Anthony Kiedis had Mr. Bungle removed from a series of summer festivals in Europe. As a major headlining act at the festivals, Kiedis and his band had a say in which bands could appear. The reasoning behind his actions have never been explained, although he had been involved in a public dispute with Mike Patton and his former band Faith No More a decade prior, where he accused Patton of stealing his style. According to Mr. Bungle themselves, Kiedis didn't know anyone involved with the band, aside from Mike Patton. Patton himself stated, "the rest of the band doesn't care. It's something to do with Anthony."

As a result of the concert removals, Mr. Bungle parodied the Red Hot Chili Peppers on Halloween 1999, in Pontiac, Michigan (the home state of Kiedis). Patton introduced each Mr. Bungle band member with the name of one of the Red Hot Chili Peppers, before covering the songs "Give It Away", "Around the World", "Under the Bridge" and "Scar Tissue", with Patton deliberately using incorrect lyrics, such as "Sometimes I feel like I'm on heroin" and "Sometimes I feel like a fucking junkie" on "Under the Bridge". Patton impersonated Kiedis by wearing a blonde wig and speaking with a lisp, and while pretending to be Kiedis, mockingly said to the crowd: "Don't you call me Mike, my name is Anthony. How dare you make that mistake. Mike has been ripping me off for many years." The other members of Mr. Bungle, amidst their on-stage antics, satirized many of the mannerisms of the band and simulated heroin injections, as well as mocking deceased guitarist Hillel Slovak and deceased friend of the band River Phoenix. In between "No One Knew They Were Robots" and "The Air-Conditioned Nightmare", Dunn (dressed as Flea) walked up to Spruance (dressed as the ghost of Hillel Slovak) and simulated injecting him with heroin, which Patton interrupted by shouting "You can't shoot up a ghost!".

Regarding the Halloween show, Trey Spruance said, "It was pretty weird, having been fans of the first two RHCP albums, realizing that somehow something personal had gone amiss somewhere. So amiss that a decade and a half after we’d liked this now hugely popular band’s music (and hadn't thought much about since), we'd be dealing with the fact that they were unmistakably trying to bury us. Why keep quiet? I remember drawing everybody’s tattoos. James Rotundi our touring keyboardist knew the band's more recent music, and he's a great guitarist, so he did those duties." Dunn reflected "We had a member of the tour crew buy the most recent album of them (Californication) and then we proceeded to learn it in the back of the stage before the show. It wasn't hard. The hardest part was copying his tattoos with a permanent marker. I remember it was very funny to ridicule them without thinking about whether they would be aware or not. We were pretty pissed off for all the financial and personal damage that they caused to us based on their egos and freaks of power. We should probably have sued them."

Kiedis responded to the Halloween parody by having Mr. Bungle removed from the 2000 Big Day Out festival in Australia and New Zealand. He said of the festival shows, “I would not have given fucking two fucks if they fucking played there with us. But after I fucking heard about [the] fucking Halloween show where they mocked us, fuck him and fuck the whole fucking band. I hope they all die.” Patton went on to claim that Kiedis' actions had "ruined" Mr. Bungle's career, while Trevor Dunn remarked, "It really screwed us up. It screwed up my life in a personal way." 

The band officially split in 2004, although they had been on hiatus since playing their final concert on September 9, 2000 in Nottingham, England.
 On his personal website, Dunn later wrote, "Everything you've ever heard about the Red Hot Chile Poppers [sic] screwing us is true. I'm not sure why they did it other than a non-singer's jealousy. They kept us off of festivals in Europe, Big Day Out in Australia and they had the release date of our record postponed while they released Californication. Ultimately they screwed ME out of a lot of money for which I will forever harbor anger. The best part is they had full support from their record label."

Live performances
On previous tours, Mr. Bungle were known for their characteristically unconventional stage shows, where the band members would dress up in costumes and masks. The 1999-2000 shows in support of California usually featured Dunn dressed as a blonde girl resembling Goldilocks or The St. Pauli Girl, although for the other members this period was largely devoid of masks and outfits due to the increased demands of the music.

As with the previous "Disco Volante Tour", songs from the group's self-titled debut and independent demos were largely absent, with the exceptions of "Quote Unquote", "My Ass Is on Fire" (reworked with electronic elements), and several of the band's early independent death metal songs, which were featured as part of a medley along with the Disco Volante song "Merry Go Bye Bye".

Critical reception and legacy 

California was well received by critics. A positive review came from Pitchfork, who called it "one of those albums that you can't believe a major label had anything to do with", writing, "the more I listen to California, the more I'm convinced that Mike Patton is really the devil on holiday." Steve Huey of AllMusic similarly remarked that the album "[will] make you marvel at the fact that such a defiantly odd, uncommercial band recorded for Warner Bros." In 2017, Canadian site Exclaim! cited it as an essential album in Mike Patton's career discography, claiming "California maintained the strange stylings that Mr. Bungle fans had come to love by that point, but remains beautiful and melodic to this day."

Experimental artist Igorrr was greatly influenced by the album, especially by its track "Ars Moriendi". The 2005 single "Unretrofied" (from the album Miss Machine) by The Dillinger Escape Plan, who toured with Mr. Bungle in 1999, was inspired by the feelings that the song "Retrovertigo" evoked in guitarist Ben Weinman after listening to it every night. On June 30, 2017, the metal band Avenged Sevenfold released a studio cover of "Retrovertigo".

Accolades

Track listing

Personnel

Mr. Bungle 
 Trevor Dunn – bass guitar, artwork concept and production
 Danny Heifetz – percussion, drums, keyboards and production
 Clinton "Bär" McKinnon – saxophone, keyboards, French horn and production
 Mike Patton – vocals, keyboards, artwork concept and production
 Trey Spruance – guitar, engineering, production strategy and production

Additional personnel 
 Bill Banovetz – English horn
 Sam Bass – cello
 Ben Barnes – violin and viola
 Henri Ducharme – accordion
 Timba Harris – trumpet
 Marika Hughes – cello
 Eyvind Kang – violin, viola
 Carla Kihlstedt – violin and viola
 Michael Peloquin – harmonica
 David Phillips – pedal steel guitar
 Larry Ragent – French horn
 Jay Stebley – cymbalom
 Aaron Seeman – piano
 William Winant – timpani, mallets, tam tam and bass drum
 Billy Anderson – engineering
 Gibbs Chapman – mixing
 Ryan Cooper – publicity
 Elizabeth Gregory – legal representation
 Josh Heller – engineering
 Malcom Hillier – sleeve photography
 George Horn – mastering
 Adam Muñoz – engineering, mixing and editing
 Mackie Osborne – sleeve layout and graphic design
 Justin Phelps – engineering
 Rob Worthington – mixing

References 

Mr. Bungle albums
1999 albums
Warner Records albums